An  is a traditional Japanese case for holding small objects, suspended from the  (sash) worn around the waist when wearing a kimono.

As the technique developed from the late Edo period to the Meiji period (1868–1912) and the artistic value of  increased,  were no longer used as an accessory and came to be regarded as an art object for collection.

Description
Consisting of a stack of tiny, nested boxes,  were most commonly used to carry medicine. The stack of boxes is held together by a cord that is laced through cord runners down one side, under the bottom, and up the opposite side.

 are mostly made from paper, wood, metal, or ivory, with the most common material being paper.

Though  and  evolved out of a mostly decorative capacity,  retained their functionality, having evolved from strictly utilitarian articles into objects of high art and immense craftsmanship.

For a period of time in the Edo period,  was also used as a symbol of power. Today, among sumo referees, only  of the higher ranks are allowed to equip .

Today, many  are collected in the Metropolitan Museum of Art, the British Museum, and the Victoria and Albert Museum. Because  were popular among foreign collectors, there were few of the highest quality  made from the end of the Edo period to the Meiji period in Japan, but Masayuki Murata actively collected them from the 21st century, and today the Kiyomizu Sannenzaka Museum, which he manages, houses many of the highest quality .

Today,  are made by a few craftsmen. The best lacquer technique from the end of the Edo period to the Meiji period, especially the  technique, was almost lost in the westernization of Japanese lifestyle. However, in 1985 lacquer craftsman  set up his own studio  and succeeded in recreating them. His lacquer works are collected in the Victoria and Albert Museum and the 21st Century Museum of Contemporary Art, Kanazawa, and are an object of collection for the world's wealthy. Nowadays,  are rarely worn as kimono accessories, but there are collectors all over the world.

Gallery

See also
Sporran (Scottish)

References

 Bushell, Raymond "The  Handbook", Weatherhill, 2002. 
 "Legend in Japanese Art" by Henri L. Joly; 1908/1967; Charles E. Tuttle, Rutland VT;

External links

Netsuke: masterpieces from the Metropolitan Museum of Art, an exhibition catalog from The Metropolitan Museum of Art (fully available online as PDF), which contains many examples of 
Birmingham Museums & Art Gallery

Fashion accessories
Japanese lacquerware
Japanese words and phrases
Japanese woodwork
Nested containers
Medicine storage containers